Derek Smith is a footballer who played as a forward in the Football League for Everton and Tranmere Rovers.  Later played non-league football with Chorley, Nantwich Town and Ellesmere Port Town.

References

1946 births
Living people
Footballers from Liverpool
Association football forwards
English footballers
Everton F.C. players
Tranmere Rovers F.C. players
Ellesmere Port Town F.C. players
English Football League players